The Wawagosic River is a tributary of the Turgeon River flowing the municipality of Eeyou Istchee James Bay (Municipality), in the administrative region of Nord-du-Québec , in Quebec, in Canada.

Geography 
The surrounding hydrographic slopes of the Wawagosic River are:
North side: Turgeon River;
East side: Octave River (Harricana River);
South side: Chicobi Lake, Kaomakomiskiwag stream
West side: Lake Turgeon, Turgeon River.

The water head of the Wawagosic River is located on the border of the administrative regions of Nord-du-Québec and Abitibi-Témiscamingue. The Wawagosic River originates in a small marsh north of Authier Lake, in the unorganized territory of Lac-Chicobi, Quebec, west of the Octave River (Harricana River) and north of Chicobi Lake. This sector is included in the Esker-Mistaouac's proposed biodiversity reserve. The head of the river drains the waters of the western slope of Saucer Hills and Mount Plamondon.

Located in the southeastern corner of Bacon Township, Wawagosic Lake flows into the river of the same name by the Tangente River which flows  to the southwest, to reach the Wawagosic River.

The Wawagosic River flows mostly north, with some segment westward, across many marsh areas. On its course, the river drains the waters from the lakes: Motherland, Plamondon, Wawagosic, Cadieux, Carheil, Horney, Morin, Cadieux, Dent, Leblond and Casgrain. The Wawagosic River flows into the Turgeon River which is a tributary of the Harricana River.

Toponymy
According to reports from 1908 surveyors who were exploring the area for the development of northwestern Quebec for the eventual arrival of the National Transcontinental Railway, this river was identified popularly as "Croche River". The name "Wawagotig" of Algonquin origin, meaning "river in zigzag", was also used to describe this body of water. The Algonquins of Pikogan had named Lake Wawagosic; this lake is characterized by its sandy coastline and several islands. This latter meaning applies very well to the river whose clayey and rockless edges have been noted since the beginning of the century.

The toponym "rivière Wawagosic" was made official on December 5, 1968, at the Bank of Place Names of the Commission de toponymie du Québec.

Notes and references

See also 

Mistaouac River, a watercourse
Kadabakato River, a watercourse
Tangente River, a watercourse
Perdrix River (Eeyou Istchee Baie-James), a watercourse
Menard River, a waterscourse
Octave River (Harricana River)
Turgeon River
Harricana River
James Bay
Lac-Chicobi, Quebec, unorganized territory
Eeyou Istchee James Bay (municipality)
List of rivers of Quebec

Rivers of Nord-du-Québec